Allyssa Wolf (born 1971) is an American poet. Her first book of poems Vaudeville was published in 2006 under the imprint Seismicity Editions, by the Otis College of Art and Design. She is the recipient of a 2006 Gertrude Stein Award and was 1st Runner-Up for the Robin Blaser Award in 2015. Her poetry was part of the Bunker Poetico installation and anthology for the 49th Venice Bienalle. Her second tract, Loquela, was published in 2011 by Insert Blanc Press. Her third book of poetry, The Book of Coming and Going Forth by Day was pulled from circulation by the author, as she refused to write or publish poetry for three years for political reasons, only then publishing one poem in a magazine out of Singapore, and submitting 3 to the Canadian Robin Blaser Award. She has said she is working on a novel called 'The Murder of the Real and has reportedly resumed writing poetry.

Life
Born in Columbus, Ohio, Wolf left home at seventeen and moved to the Lower East Side of Manhattan. She has since lived in Los Angeles, and, currently, San Francisco.

Career

Jacket magazine said of Vaudeville: "Read this book in a theatre or in the street propped on a fire hydrant. Read it between classes, in the library, on a train; read it at a poetry reading, read it in jail — anywhere. It is that book which begs to be myth. I have not seen pages nor have I heard poems. No. Reading this book I have allowed myself the gift of beauty redivivus!"

Recently, poet and critic Philip Jenks, reassessed the importance of Vaudeville, at The Poetry Foundation, saying, "It’s been ten years since Allyssa Wolf’s Vaudeville was published. It says so on the page, but I’m having trouble believing. Dare to suggest a timeless text was written not in some other era, not by some dead white man, not. I cannot prove anything (the analytics versus “Being, but an Ear” (Dickinson 340)), oppose the best of, but Wolf's is verse in its purest form. Speaks to and with. Ghosts, power relations, inhabitations, gender powers, the animals, comedic horrors, and language twisting old English into the presences, or wars, just: “twisting the night away” (Wolf 37). It's a “real show” with all the horror and comity of being, shredded thus", and, "Generativity, producing, creating, these makings of words and deeds to thieve from Arendt—they are fully capable of producing horrors if one seeks to create only within the loneliness of those “grave and grainy” rooms of modernity or postmodernity or what have you. Unless we make in concert with one another, without the in-between, world become monster. A) The Holocaust never ended and B) It was/is born of a continual alienation. And it is these truths that Allyssa Wolf's beckons the reader to perhaps examine. It is night everywhere... A sort of “night of the world” as Hegel wrote.."

Awards
The first poem of Vaudeville was chosen for a PIP Gertrude Stein Award for Innovative Writing by Douglas Messerli. "Allyssa Wolf...╬Winner of the PIP Gertrude Stein Awards for Innovative Poetry in English 2005-2006 for her poem, "First Doll".

Allyssa Wolf won First Runner-up for the Capilano's Review's Fourth Annual Robin Blaser Award (2015), chosen by Daphne Marlatt.

Works

Anthologies

References 

21st-century American poets
Living people
Poets from Ohio
Poets from California
1971 births
21st-century American women writers
American women poets
Writers from Columbus, Ohio
Writers from San Francisco